Ouésso is a town in the northern Republic of the Congo, lying on the Sangha River and surrounded by rainforest.  It is linked by ferry with Brazzaville and is known for the pygmy people who live nearby.  It is the capital of the Sangha Region.

It is served by Ouésso Airport.

Sports 

The Stade de Ouesso is located in Ouesso. The stadium is mostly used for association football and also sometimes for athletics. It has a capacity of 16,000.

Climate 
Ouésso has a tropical monsoon climate (Köppen climate classification Am), bordering on a tropical rainforest climate (Af).

Timeline

2007 

In April 2007, a Korean consortium proposed to build a railway to Ouésso from Brazzaville, in exchange for a concession to harvest timber.

References 

Sangha Department (Republic of the Congo)
Populated places in the Republic of the Congo
Cameroon–Republic of the Congo border crossings